Leandro Sebastián Velázquez (born 10 May 1989) is an Argentine professional footballer who plays as an attacking midfielder for Malaysia Super League club Johor Darul Ta'zim.

Career

Club career

Velázquez made his league debut for Vélez Sársfield in the week before his 19th birthday. He played in a 1–1 draw with Racing on 4 April 2008. He scored his first goal against Estudiantes de La Plata in the Torneo Apertura 2008 and was part of the winning team in the Torneo Clausura 2009. He entered the field during the last game against Huracán when Vélez needed a victory to become champion, and was replaced by Leandro Coronel immediately after the team scored the winning goal.

Velázquez was loaned for the 2009–10 season to Newell's Old Boys.

Johor Darul Ta'zim
In October 2015, Velázquez was called up in the starting eleven in the 2015 AFC Cup Final squad for Johor Darul Ta'zim F.C., where he scored the winning goal in a 1–0 victory against FC Istiklol. On 17 January 2016, Velázquez left Johor Darul Ta'zim F.C. and joined Deportivo Pasto with free transfer fee. On 21 February 2019, Johor Darul Ta'zim F.C. confirm the return signing of Velazquez in the Johor Darul Ta'zim F.C. squad.

International

In January 2009 Velázquez was selected to join the Argentina under-20 squad for the 2009 South American Youth Championship in Venezuela. His team failed to qualify for the FIFA U-20 World Cup.

Honours 
Vélez Sársfield
Argentine Primera División: 2009 Clausura

Johor Darul Ta'zim
 Malaysia Super League: 2019, 2020, 2021, 2022
 Malaysia Cup: 2019, 2022
 Piala Sumbangsih: 2020, 2021, 2022, 2023
 Malaysia FA Cup: 2022
 AFC Cup: 2015

References

External links
 
 
 
 

1989 births
Living people
Footballers from Buenos Aires
Argentine footballers
Argentine expatriate footballers
Argentina under-20 international footballers
Association football midfielders
Club Atlético Vélez Sarsfield footballers
Newell's Old Boys footballers
San Martín de San Juan footballers
Deportivo Pasto footballers
C.D. Veracruz footballers
Águilas Doradas Rionegro players
Argentine Primera División players
Categoría Primera A players
Liga MX players
Expatriate footballers in Colombia
Expatriate footballers in Mexico
AFC Cup winning players